Fluvidona simsoniana is a species of minute freshwater snail with an operculum, an aquatic gastropod mollusk or micromollusk in the family Tateidae. This species is endemic to Australia.

References

Gastropods of Australia
Angrobia
Hydrobiidae
Gastropods described in 1875
Taxonomy articles created by Polbot
Taxobox binomials not recognized by IUCN